Joshua Sinclair-Evans (born 29 March 1995) is an English actor. He is known for portraying the role of Josh in the Disney Channel musical series The Lodge.

Life and career
Sinclair-Evans began performing from an early age, and studying musical theatre and acting at Arts Educational. He made his acting debut in theatre productions such as The Tempest, Find Me and The Distance. He is also trained in playing the piano, guitar and ukulele.

Sinclair-Evans made his television debut in the Disney Channel musical drama The Lodge. He portrayed the main role of Josh, starring in 25 episodes. His character had the first coming out scene to be aired on Disney Channel. In 2018, Sinclair-Evans made an appearance in an episode of BBC medical drama Casualty, as Sheridan Taylor. Later that year, he appeared as Shane in Free Dance. In July 2019, he appeared as Josh Scarino in Spider-Man: Far From Home.

Filmography

References

External links 
 

Living people 
1995 births
Male actors from London
English male television actors
English male film actors
People educated at the Arts Educational Schools